Sunset Pass is a 1946 American Western film directed by William Berke from a screenplay by Norman Houston, based upon the novel of the same name by Zane Grey. The film stars James Warren, Nan Leslie, John Laurenz, Jane Greer, Robert Barrat, Harry Woods, Robert Clarke, Steve Brodie, and Harry Harvey.

References

External links
 

1946 films
American Western (genre) films
1946 Western (genre) films
Films directed by William A. Berke
RKO Pictures films
Films based on works by Zane Grey
American black-and-white films
Films scored by Paul Sawtell
1940s American films
1940s English-language films